. 
Transport in Thrissur City is served by state-owned Kerala State Road Transport Corporation (KSRTC), private buses, Indian Railways, auto rickshaws and taxis. The city of Thrissur is situated in the Central part of the state of Kerala, India. It is the headquarters of the Thrissur district. It is known as the Cultural Capital of Kerala.

Public transport

For transport within the city, private buses, state buses, taxis and autos are available throughout the day. The city has a very fast and efficient bus transport system mainly dominated by private operators. Private buses operate to the nook and corner of Thrissur City.

 Shaktan Thampuran Private Bus Stand: Inter-state, district and local private buses operate from this bus terminal.
 Thrissur KSRTC bus station: All Kerala State Road Transport Corporation operates from this bus stand.

Roadways
.

National Highways
Two major National Highways traverse through Thrissur city and Thrissur Metropolitan Area:
 National Highway 544 connects Thrissur with Coimbatore city and South Tamil Nadu going through Salem, Trichy.
 National Highway 66 connects Thrissur Metropolitan Area to Karnataka, Goa and Maharashtra.

State Highways
With 101 km2 area, Thrissur city has a road network of 526 km of which nearly 76% is surfaced. The road density is 5.2 km per km2 area. The city roads are owned and maintained by Kerala Government and Thrissur Municipal Corporation.

 State Highway 22 (Kerala): This highway connects Kodungallur in Thrissur Metropolitan Area to Palakkad district.
 State Highway 49 (Kerala): This highway connects Guruvayur in Thrissur Metropolitan Area to Choondal.
 State Highway 50 (Kerala): This highway connects Chavakkad in Thrissur Metropolitan Area to Wadakkancherry.
 State Highway 51 (Kerala): This highway connects Kodakara in Thrissur Metropolitan Area to Kodungallur in Thrissur Metropolitan Area.
 State Highway 58 (Kerala): This highway connects Vadakkencherry in Thrissur Metropolitan Area to Pollachi in Tamil Nadu.
 State Highway 59 (Kerala): Hill Highway (Kerala) connects parts of hilly areas in Thrissur Metropolitan Area
 State Highway 61 (Kerala): This highway connects Potta in Thrissur Metropolitan Area to Moonupeedika Road.
 State Highway 62 (Kerala): This highway connects Guruvayur in Thrissur Metropolitan Area to Kundukadavu.
 State Highway 69 (Kerala): This highway connects Thrissur City to Thavanur in Malappuram.
 State Highway 74 (Kerala): This Highway connects Chelakkara road in Thrissur Metropolitan Area 
 State Highway 75 (Kerala): This highway connects Thrissur City to Vadanappally in Thrissur Metropolitan Area
 State Highway 76 (Kerala): This highway connects Kuruvanchery in Thrissur Metropolitan Area to Kecheri in Thrissur Metropolitan Area.
 State Highway 77 (Kerala): This highway connects Lakkidi Road in Thrissur Metropolitan Area to Palakkad district.

Distance chart

Railways

Thrissur railway station is the main railway head where all passenger, express and mail trains stop. The station lies in the heart of the city and is busiest railway station in Southern India handling over 20,000 passengers daily.

Shoranur–Cochin Harbour section and Thrissur–Guruvayur section are the two railway lines which pass through the Thrissur Metropolitan Area.

Stations in Thrissur city
 Thrissur railway station
 Ollur railway station
 Punkunnam railway station
 Mulankunnathukavu railway station

Stations in Thrissur Metropolitan Area
 Vallathol Nagar railway station
 Mullurkara railway station
 Wadakkanchery railway station
 Pudukad railway station
 Nellayi railway station
 Irinjalakuda railway station
 Chalakudi railway station
 Koratty railway station
 Divine Nagar railway station
 Guruvayur railway station

Airport

There are no airports in Thrissur City and the nearest airport is Cochin International Airport at Nedumbassery which is located 50 km. Direct domestic flights are available to major Indian cities like Chennai, New Delhi, Mumbai, Bangalore and Kolkata. International flights to Middle East cities like Bahrain, Muscat, Sharjah, Jeddah, Riyadh, Doha and to Southeast Asian cities Singapore and Kuala Lumpur are available here. It has a dedicated heli-taxi service and chartered flights. Calicut International Airport at Karipur in the Malappuram District, which is 80 km from city and Coimbatore Airport, which is 114 kilometers from the city also can be used by travellers.

Heliport

There are four functional heliports in Thrissur city. One is at Sri C. Achutha Menon Government College ground, Kuttanellur known as Kuttanellur Heliport, and the second one at Lulu Convention Centre. The third is in Sobha City above the Sobha Topaz building, and the fourth helipad is owned by Kalyan Jewellers inside the Sobha City complex. Kalyan Jewellers helipad is in 6 acres of land.

References

See also
 Indian Railways
 Kerala State Road Transport Corporation